Cornered may refer to:
 Cornered (1924 film), a 1924 silent film
 Cornered (1932 film), a 1932 Pre Code western film
 Cornered (1945 film), a 1945 film noir starring Dick Powell
 Cornered! (film), a 2010 horror film starring Steve Guttenberg
 Cornered (comics), a comic strip
 "Cornered" (Breaking Bad), a season four episode of Breaking Bad